is a Japanese law which sets the standards for the Japanese education system.

Summary 
The Fundamental Law of Education, as the name suggests, is a law concerning the foundation of Japanese education. MEXT translations into English entitle it the Basic Act on Education.

The Fundamental Law of Education contains a preamble and 18 Articles. The law sets out the purposes and objectives of education and provides for equal opportunity in education, compulsory education, coeducation, social education, political education, religious education, educational administration, etc. Article 1 states that the law
shall aim for the full development of personality and strive to nurture the citizens, sound in mind and body, who are imbued with the qualities necessary for those who form a peaceful and democratic state and society.

The current Fundamental law was enacted on December 22, 2006, replacing the previous 11-article Act of March 31, 1947 (the 'old fundamental law of Education').

Original 1947 enactment

The old law was created under the auspices of SCAP, enacted by the 90th session of the Imperial Japanese Diet, which would be the last Imperial Diet conducted under the Imperial Japanese Constitution. It is often said that the old Fundamental Law of Education was written in the spirit of the new Japanese Constitution, representing a radical means of education reform, and replacing the pre-World War II Imperial Rescript on Education, which was based partly on Confucianist thought.

During the debate about constitutional reform, it was argued that provisions regarding education should be included in the national constitution itself.  However, the Minister of Education at that time, Kōtarō Tanaka, proposed the creation of a separate law regarding education.  The Ministry of Education then created an Educational Reform Committee, which deliberated over the contents of the Fundamental Law.  The law was approved by the Imperial Diet as was written in the original draft, without revision.

Provisions of the Fundamental Law of Education

 Preamble

 Chapter 1 Aims and Principles of Education
 Article 1 Aims of Education

 Article 2 Objectives of Education

 Whilst respect academic freedom, education will aim

 Article 3 Concept of Lifelong Learning
 Article 4 Equal Opportunity in Education
 "Citizens shall all be given equal opportunities to receive education according to their abilities, and shall not be subject to discrimination in education on account of race, creed, sex, social status, economic position, or family origin" 
 People living with disabilities or financial hardship will be supported

 Chapter 2 Basics of Education Provision
 Article 5 Compulsory Education
 Citizens have an obligation to education their children to "cultivate the foundations for an independent life within society".
 Compulsory education is free. 
 Article 6 School Education
 The government regulates the establishment of schools for compulsory education 
 Article 7 Universities
 Universities exist to seek truth, create knowledge, disseminate knowledge and specialised skills broadly, etc
 The intellectual autonomy of universities is ensured.
 Article 8 Private Schools
 Government will promote education in private schools
 Article 9 Teachers

 Article 10 Education in the Family
 Parents have the responsibility to teach children basic habits for living, a spirit of independence, and encourage the development of body and mind. 
 Families will be supported in this by government.
 Article 11 Early Childhood Education
 Government will promote early childhood education and maintain standards in those environments.
 Article 12 Social Education
 Government will support community education, including "libraries, museums, community halls and other social education facilities, opening the usage of school facilities, providing opportunities to learn, relevant information, and other appropriate means"
 Article 13 Partnership and Cooperation among Schools, Families, and Local Residents
 "Schools, families, local residents, and other relevant persons shall be aware of their respective roles and responsibilities regarding education, and endeavor to develop partnership and cooperation"
 Article 14 Political Education
 Political literacy and citizenship will be promoted
 Schools will refrain from political education and activity.
 Article 15 Religious Education

 Chapter 3 Education Administration
 Article 16 Education Administration
 Government will provide for equal opportunities, raise the standards of education, respond to regional circumstances
 Government will work in the spirit of cooperation without improper controls.
 Article 17 Basic Plan for the Promotion of Education
 Government will systematically formulate plans to achieve educational objectives, make it public and report to the diet.

 Chapter 4 Enactment of Laws and Regulations
 Article 18 
 "Laws and regulations necessary to implement the provisions stipulated in this Act shall be enacted"

2006 Revisions 

Soon after the passing of the Fundamental Law, there were numerous arguments suggesting its revision.  Some suggested that ideas of patriotism and regard for Japanese traditions were lacking, and others maintained that such provisions could lead to renewed feelings of nationalism and subservience to the state.  Such arguments have been brought up repeatedly since the law was first passed.

On April 28, 2006, the Cabinet drafted a reformed version of the law which was submitted to the 164th ordinary session of the National Diet (sitting from January to June 2006).  The draft is composed of a preamble and 18 articles.  The new preamble does not include the phrase "the realization of the ideals laid forth in the constitution depend on the education of the people", as is stated in the current law, and includes some additions, such as the phrases "community spirit" and "the inheritance of tradition".  In addition, the "purpose of education" has been divided into five items, containing such moral provisions as "to nurture an attitude[...]to love our country and our home".

On May 2, 2006, the Ministry of Education announced that they had established a "Fundamental Law of Education Reform Promotion Headquarters" under the direction of Kenji Kosaka, the Minister of Education.  The first meeting was scheduled for May 8, and a project team was established.  The objective of this group is not only to regulate argument in the Diet, but also to assist in initiatives to explain the educational reforms to the public and decide on basic programs promoting education.

On December 22, 2006 the complete revision of the Fundamental Law of Education passed and was implemented. It now contains 18 Articles.

Main points of contention 

Opinion was divided on whether students should receive education "according to individual ability" or "equally". The new Law does not contain the word "equally" any longer.

There was also debate about whether the absolution of school fees at public universities should be limited only to tuition costs, or should also include textbook fees, food costs, commutation costs, etc.

There was debate concerning the topic of political neutrality, namely, what kind of political education should be forbidden, and how to harmonize this with the promotion of political interest amongst students. In 1954, the Japanese government, aiming to curb political activity by the Japan Teachers Union, passed a law designed to ensure "political neutrality" in Japanese public schools. In 2004, Prime Minister Junichiro Koizumi refused to accept a petition—written by Japanese high school students—against the deployment of the Japan Self-Defense Forces to Iraq
, said to be due to the prohibition on political education.

Political Debate 

On March 20, 2003, based on the discussions of the People's Educational Reform Council (a consultative body to the Prime Minister dissolved in Dec. 2000), the Central Education Council reported to Minister of Education Atsuko Toyama on the necessity of reform to the Fundamental Law.

According to the report, the concepts expressed in the Fundamental Law should continue to be valued; however, in order to meet the challenges of the 21st century, the following reforms would be necessary.
the establishment of a trustworthy schooling system
promotion of university reform, to become leaders in the information age
to restore the educational ability of the family, and to promote a society in which the school, family, and local community cooperate
to foster attitudes to take part in community planning
to foster respect for Japanese traditions and culture, to encourage love for the homeland, and promote the spirit of membership in the international community
the realization of a society based on lifelong learning
to decide on a master plan to encourage education

In April 2004, the ruling Liberal Democratic and Komei Parties reached an agreement on the meaning of the term "patriotism" ("to value customs and culture, and to love our country, from which they have developed") and submitted a reform proposal to the Diet, the first such proposal to be submitted to the Diet since the end of World War II.

The proposed reforms reflect three influential lines of thinking.

Educational reform is necessary to nurture an educational elite and in order for Japan to continue to be a leader in developing cutting-edge technology.
Problem children responsible for the disintegration of Japanese society (including such problems as youth crime, bullying and truancy) can be dealt with through home discipline, the strengthening of moral education, and community service.
The expansion of the Ministry of Education's realm of authority is critical.  The reformed law would give the Ministry of Education a virtually free hand with regards to educational administration.

Moral education 

The extent and nature of moral education is a frequent point of debate in government and academia.

The old Fundamental law did not contain provisions regarding moral education, although moral education features in the curriculum overseen by the Ministry of Education.  Along with other provisions in order to "broaden" the scope of the law, there were added provisions regarding moral education. For example, the objective in Article 2(5)

is designed to satisfy both conservative views on patriotism and progressive views on global integration and/or focus on individualism.

See also 

 Education in Japan

References

External links 
 Basic Act on Education (Act No. 120 of December 22, 2006) - MEXT

1947 in law
Education laws and guidelines in Japan